The 1991 World Archery Championships was the 36th edition of the event. It was held in Krakow, Poland on 19–24 August 1991 and was organised by World Archery Federation (FITA).

It marked the last time the Soviet Union competed in the World Championships.

Medals summary

Recurve

Medals table

References

External links
 World Archery website

World Championship
World Archery
A
World Archery Championships